Báitǔ (白土镇) may refer to the following towns in China:

 Baitu, Anhui, in Xiao County
 Baitu, Gaoyao, Guangdong
 Baitu, Shaoguan, in Qujiang District, Shaoguan, Guangdong
 Baitu, Hebei, in Ci County
 Baitu, Jiangxi, in Fengcheng

See also 

 Baudu